Eurema desjardinsii, the angled grass yellow, is a butterfly of the family Pieridae, found in Africa.

The wingspan is 35–38 mm for males and 37–40 mm for females. Adults are on wing year-round, depending on rainfall.

The larvae feed on Chamaecrista mimosoides and probably Hypericum aethiopicum.

Subspecies
Eurema desjardinsii desjardinsi (Madagascar, Comoro Islands)
Eurema desjardinsii marshalli (Butler, 1898) (Kenya, South Africa)

References

Seitz, A. Die Gross-Schmetterlinge der Erde 13: Die Afrikanischen Tagfalter. Plate 22e 

Butterflies described in 1833
desjardinsii